Jerome Bonaparte Miller (August 12, 1846 – December 10, 1920) was a member of the Wisconsin State Assembly.

Biography
Miller was born on August 12, 1846, in Sherman, New York. During the American Civil War, he served with the 151st Illinois Volunteer Infantry Regiment of the Union Army. Afterwards, he settled in Alma Center, Wisconsin, where he was a bank cashier worked in hardware. Miller died there on December 10, 1920.

His brother, Edwin A. Miller, was also a member of the Assembly.

Political career
Miller was a Republican member of the Assembly during the 1895 session. Additionally, he was a member of the town board (similar to city council) of Alma Center and of the county board of Jackson County, Wisconsin.

References

People from Chautauqua County, New York
People from Alma Center, Wisconsin
Wisconsin city council members
County supervisors in Wisconsin
People of Illinois in the American Civil War
Union Army soldiers
1846 births
1920 deaths
Republican Party members of the Wisconsin State Assembly